Technical Systems Consultants (TSC) was a United States software company.
Headquartered first in West Lafayette, Indiana (it was started by Don Kinzer and Dave Shirk, EE graduate students at Purdue University) and later (1980) moved to Chapel Hill, North Carolina, it was the foremost supplier of software for SWTPC compatible hardware, as well as many other early makes of personal computers. Their software included operating systems (Flex, mini-FLEX, FLEX09, and UniFlex) and various languages (several BASIC variants, FORTRAN, Pascal, C and assemblers).

References

Software companies based in North Carolina
Defunct companies based in North Carolina
Defunct software companies of the United States